The Perry L. Biddle House is a historic house located at 203 Scribner Avenue in DeFuniak Springs, Florida. It is locally significant as one of the best examples of the houses constructed in an early subdivision of DeFuniak Springs, outside of the heavy development which took place around Lake DeFuniak, and is also a good example of Frame Vernacular construction.

Description and history 
It was built in 1887 by Perry L. Biddle, who settled in DeFuniak Springs about 1886. The house is a large symmetrical design that displays a cross gable roof with a simple frieze that encircles the building. The original, two-story primary unit has the shape of a MT," and a roof covered with tin standing seam panels, which appear to have replaced the original pressed-metal shingles.

It was added to the National Register of Historic Places on August 28, 1992.

References

External links
 Walton County listings at National Register of Historic Places
 Walton County listings at Florida's Office of Cultural and Historical Programs

Gallery

Houses on the National Register of Historic Places in Florida
Houses in Walton County, Florida
Vernacular architecture in Florida
National Register of Historic Places in Walton County, Florida
Houses completed in 1887
1887 establishments in Florida